Tyler Buchner is an American football quarterback for the Notre Dame Fighting Irish.

High school career
Buchner attended The Bishop's School in La Jolla, California before transferring to Helix High School in La Mesa, California for his senior year. He did not play football his senior year in 2020 due to the Covid-19 pandemic. As a junior in 2019, Buchner passed for 4,474 yards with 53 passing touchdowns and 1,610 rushing yards and 28 rushing touchdowns. He committed to the University of Notre Dame to play college football.

College career
Buchner spent his first year at Notre Dame in 2021 as a backup to Jack Coan. He appeared in 10 games, completing 21 of 35 passes for 298 yards with three touchdowns and three interceptions. He also rushed for 336 yards and three touchdowns. Buchner competed with Drew Pyne to take over as the team's starting quarterback in 2022. He injured his shoulder during Notre Dame's loss to Marshall on September 10, 2022 and missed the remainder of the 2022 regular season. He returned to the field for Notre Dame's victory against South Carolina in the 2022 Gator Bowl.

Statistics

References

External links
Notre Dame Fighting Irish bio

Living people
Players of American football from California
American football quarterbacks
Notre Dame Fighting Irish football players
2002 births